Luppitt is a village and civil parish in East Devon situated about  due north of Honiton.

The historian William Harris was preacher at the village's Presbyterian chapel from 1741 to 1770.

Towards the end of his life, the painter Robert Polhill Bevan (1865-1925) had a cottage called Marlpits on Luppitt Common, in which he painted a number of views of the neighbourhood.

The Luppitt Inn is a public house on the Campaign for Real Ale's National Inventory of Historic Pub Interiors.

Historic estates
Mohuns Ottery, a seat of the Carew family, Barons Carew. See: William Henry Hamilton Rogers (1823-1913), Memorials of the West, Historical and Descriptive, Collected on the Borderland of Somerset, Dorset and Devon, Exeter, 1888, Chapter The Nest of Carew (Ottery-Mohun). See also: Vivian, Lt.Col. J.L., (Ed.) The Visitations of the County of Devon: Comprising the Heralds' Visitations of 1531, 1564 & 1620, Exeter, 1895, pp. 134–5, pedigree of Carew of Mohuns Ottery.

References

External links
 http://www.luppitt.net/

Villages in Devon
Civil parishes in Devon
East Devon District